Michael Francis Aponte (born 29 October 1970) is a Puerto Rican retired long jumper. His personal best jump was 8.18 metres, achieved in May 1995 in Raleigh.

He won the silver medal at the 1993 Central American and Caribbean Games. He also competed at the 1992 Olympic Games without reaching the final.

International competitions

References

1970 births
Living people
Puerto Rican male long jumpers
Athletes (track and field) at the 1992 Summer Olympics
Olympic track and field athletes of Puerto Rico
Athletes (track and field) at the 1995 Pan American Games
Central American and Caribbean Games silver medalists for Puerto Rico
Competitors at the 1993 Central American and Caribbean Games
Central American and Caribbean Games medalists in athletics
Pan American Games competitors for Puerto Rico
20th-century Puerto Rican people